André Charles Peloffy (born February 25, 1951) is a French former professional ice hockey forward. He was the first person born in France to play in the National Hockey League (NHL).

Playing career
Drafted by the New York Rangers in the 1971 NHL Entry Draft, Peloffy never played for the Rangers and was traded to the Washington Capitals prior to the 1974–75 NHL season and played nine games during the team's inaugural season. His principal success came in the American Hockey League with the Springfield Indians, Providence Reds and Richmond Robins. He won the John B. Sollenberger Trophy as the AHL's scoring champion with the Springfield Indians in 1976–77.

He would also play 10 games for the New England Whalers of the World Hockey Association.

After his North American hockey career, he played professionally in Europe for ten seasons, and became France's all-time leading scorer in international play, scoring 55 points in 42 games for the national team. He retired after the 1989 season.

Career statistics

Regular season and playoffs

International

References

External links

Profile at hockeydraftcentral.com

1951 births
Living people
Canadian ice hockey centres
Diables Noirs de Tours players
Ice hockey players at the 1988 Winter Olympics
Laval Saints players
New England Whalers players
New York Rangers draft picks
Olympic ice hockey players of France
People from Laurentides
People from Sète
New Haven Blades players
Richmond Robins players
Providence Reds players
Springfield Indians players
EC VSV players
Washington Capitals players
Sportspeople from Hérault
French emigrants to Quebec
Ice hockey people from Quebec